The Henry and Barbara Bierbauer House is located in New Lisbon, Wisconsin.

History
The Bierbauers were immigrants from Bavaria. Henry founded a brewery and served as a local politician, eventually becoming Mayor of New Lisbon. The house remained in the Bierbauer family until 1947. During the 1950s and 1960s, it was used as a nursing home. Beginning in 2011, it underwent an extensive restoration.

The house was added to the State and the National Register of Historic Places in 2016.

References

Houses on the National Register of Historic Places in Wisconsin
National Register of Historic Places in Juneau County, Wisconsin
Houses in Juneau County, Wisconsin
Nursing homes in the United States
Italianate architecture in Wisconsin
Brick buildings and structures
Houses completed in 1869